Suranga is a traditional Indian water management system.

Suranga may also refer to:

People
 Sumudu Suranga (born 1982), Sri Lankan cricketer
 Suranga Adikari (born 1979), Sri Lankan athlete
 Suranga Arunakumara (born 1978), Sri Lankan cricketer
 Suranga Chandratillake (born 1977), Sri Lankan entrepreneur
 Suranga Lakmal (born 1987), Sri Lankan cricketer
 Suranga Lokubalasuriya, Sri Lankan cricketer
 Suranga Nanayakkara (born 1981), Sri Lankan computer scientist and inventor
 Suranga Perera (born 1974), Sri Lankan cricketer
 Suranga Sampath, Sri Lankan blind cricketer

Places
 Suranga, Dhanbad, a census town in Dhanbad district, Jharkhand, India